The 1940–41 Illinois Fighting Illini men's basketball team represented the University of Illinois.

Regular season
A new decade had begun for the Fighting Illini, a decade which brought much success to Illinois basketball. Head Coach Doug Mills led the
Illini to consecutive Big Ten titles in 1942 and 1943. The Illini would add another league championship under Harry Combes in 1949. The Illini were the 13th-winningest Division I team in the nation in the 1940s. Illinois’ 150-57 record and .725 winning percentage was the best in the Big Ten. In 1941, Mills added to his coaching duties when he was named the school’s athletic director as well as continuing on as the head coach. Mills entered his fifth season with the Illini and, just as his teams had done the previous 4 seasons, had a nearly perfect record on the home court finishing with an 8-2 record.  Unfortunately for the Illini they finished with a 5-5 record on the road to finish in a third place tie overall in conference action.  Mills' team featured 8 returning letterman and had a starting lineup including team captain John Drish and Harold Shapiro at forward, Art Mathisen at the center position, and Victor Wukovits and Robert Richmond as guards.  The team also featured future major league baseball player Walter Evers

Roster

Source

Schedule

|-	
!colspan=12 style="background:#DF4E38; color:white;"| Non-Conference regular season

|- align="center" bgcolor=""

|-
!colspan=9 style="background:#DF4E38; color:#FFFFFF;"|Big Ten regular season

Bold Italic connotes conference game
												
Source

Player stats

Awards and honors
Bob Richmond
Team Most Valuable Player

References

Illinois Fighting Illini
Illinois Fighting Illini men's basketball seasons
1940 in sports in Illinois
1941 in sports in Illinois